Manhattan is the debut studio album from American rock band Skaters. It was released in February 2014 under Warner Bros. Records

Track listing

Personnel 
 Michael Ian Cummings - vocals, guitar
 Josh Hubbard - guitar
 Dan Burke - bass
 Noah Rubin - drums
 Skaters - art direction, producers
 John Hill - producer
 Brian Gardner - mastering
 Cenzo Townshend - mixing
 Phil Joly - engineer
 Laura Sisk - engineer
 Emmett Farley - engineer
 Sean Julliard  - assistant engineer
 Joe Maccann - assistant engineer
 Elizabeth Bauer - assistant engineer
 Nick Bobetsky - management
 Adam Herzog - A&R
 Jeff Sosnow - A&R
 Donny Phillips - art direction
 Jay Roeder - logo design
 Lele Saveri - photography
 Pete Volker - photography
 Kelsey Bennett - photography
 Shane McCauley - photography

Charts

References

2014 albums
Skaters (band) albums
Warner Records albums